The men's pole vault event at the 2006 Commonwealth Games was held on March 24.

Results

References
Results

Pole
2006